Colin Ryan (born 2 September 1988) is an Irish hurler. His league and championship career with the Clare senior team lasted ten years from 2007 to 2017.

Born in Newmarket-on-Fergus, County Clare, Ryan first played competitive hurling during his schooling at St. Flannan's College. Here he won an All-Ireland medal in 2005, as well as back-to-back Harty Cup medals. Ryan simultaneously began his club career at juvenile and underage levels with Newmarket-on-Fergus. After earlier winning several county under-21 championship medals, he won a county senior championship medal in 2012.

Ryan made his debut on the inter-county scene at the age of sixteen when he joined the Clare minor team. After little success in this grade, he later won an All-Ireland medal with the under-21 team in 2009. By this stage Ryan had joined the Clare senior team, making his debut during the 2007 championship. Over the course of the next ten years, Ryan won one All-Ireland medal and one National Hurling League medal. Having earlier announced that he was taking an extended break from inter-county hurling, Ryan announced his retirement from the game on 6 October 2017.	

As a member of the Munster inter-provincial team, Ryan won one Railway Cup medal.

Ryan attended NUI Galway. He played for the university hurling team in the Fitzgibbon Cup, and was part of the side that lost the 2007 final.

Career statistics

Honours

Team
St. Flannan's College
All-Ireland Colleges' Senior Hurling Championship (1): 2005
Munster Colleges' Senior Hurling Championship (2): 2004, 2005

Newmarket-on-Fergus
Clare Senior Hurling Championship (1): 2012

Clare
All-Ireland Senior Hurling Championship (1): 2013
National Hurling League (Division 1B) (1): 2012
National Hurling League (Division 1A) (1): 2016
All-Ireland Under-21 Hurling Championship (1): 2009
Munster Under-21 Hurling Championship (1): 2009

Munster
Railway Cup (1): 2013

References

1988 births
Living people
Alumni of the University of Galway
Clare inter-county hurlers
Irish schoolteachers
Munster inter-provincial hurlers
Newmarket-on-Fergus hurlers
University of Galway hurlers